Hačava (1409 Hach, Bognerhey) is a village and municipality in Košice-okolie District in the Košice Region of eastern Slovakia.

History
First mention of the village is to be found in records dating back to 1409 when it was funded by German settlers driven here by a certain Master Wagner. In the 16th century it belonged to the noble family of Széchy. During that period, it was destroyed by Turks and suffered greatly because of the Polish-Lithuanian War. The place remained almost deserted. In the 18th century some Rusyn colonists contributed to repopulate the village.

Geography

The village lies at an altitude of 660 meters and covers an area of 36.918 km². It has a population of about 225 people. It lies in Hajska-dolina underneath Jeleni Vrch. There is a bike trail available that begins at the town of Moldava-nad-Bodvou, travelling through the nearby village of Haj and ends at Knizna Polona. It is surrounded by a mountainous forest area and a cave is located a few kilometres away.

Genealogical resources

Records for genealogical research are available at the state archive "Statny Archiv in Kosice, Slovakia"

 Greek Catholic church records (births/marriages/deaths): 1810-1926 (parish A)

See also
 List of municipalities and towns in Slovakia

References

External links
 
Surnames of living people in Hacava

Villages and municipalities in Košice-okolie District